Whose Meal Ticket is a 2017 Nigerian film written by Grace Edwin-Okon and produced by Kehinde Omoru under the guide of Roxanne Care Options Foundation.  The film is a follow-up of deeply cut, and it focused on diabetes and how the patients can easily manage the sickness. It stars Akin Lewis, Ngozi Nwosu, Uti Nwachukwu, Shaffy Bello, Lisa Omorodion, Tana Adelana, Femi Durojaiye and Iyke Nnabuife.

Synopsis 
The movie revolves around a family who is desperate to get their daughter married to a young rich man because of the wealth of his family.

Premiere 
The film was premiered in Lagos at the Palms, Lekki, on April 15, 2017. At the premiering, The producer who is a nurse revealed that diabetes is a serious disease, but she wanted to advocate it in a subtle way that people will understand the damage it can cause and how they can deal with it. On the 24 April 2017 the film was premiered in different cinemas across the country.

Cast 
Tana Adelana
Shaffy Bello
Femi Durojaiye
Akin Lewis
Iyke Nnabuife
Uti Nwachukwu
Ngozi Nwosu
Lisa Omorodion
Layole Oyatogun

External link

References 

2017 films
English-language Nigerian films